This is a list of films produced in Switzerland. For an A-Z list see :Category:Swiss films.

1920s

1930s

1940s

1950s

1960s

1970s

1980s

1990s

2000s

2010s

2020s

References

External links
 Swiss film at the Internet Movie Database
 Swiss Film Directory
 artfilm.ch  Swiss Films on DVD